Marjan Lazovski (7 September 1962 – 19 December 2020) was a Macedonian professional basketball player and coach of KK Rabotnički, MZT Aerodrom, Vardar, and AMAK SP.

Career
Lazovski served as an assistant coach for the Macedonia national basketball team for five years. In February 2012, he was named head coach after former boss Marin Dokuzovski decided not to continue in the job.
As of 5 October 2012, Lazovski had resigned from his post as head coach of the Macedonia national basketball team, citing health reasons and club team needs, as first priority.

Lazovski died at age 58 on 19 December 2020, from COVID-19 during the COVID-19 pandemic in North Macedonia.

References

External links
 
 Player Profile

1962 births
2020 deaths
Macedonian basketball coaches
Sportspeople from Skopje
Deaths from the COVID-19 pandemic in North Macedonia